Wang Zhu (born August 13, 1987) is a Chinese Grand Prix motorcycle racer.

Career statistics

By season

Races by year
(key)

References

External links
  Profile on motogp.com

Chinese motorcycle racers
Living people
1987 births
250cc World Championship riders
Sportspeople from Xi'an